Aristidis Tsatsakis (Greek: Αριστείδης Τσατσάκης) is a Greek toxicologist. He directs the Laboratory of Forensic Science & Toxicology at the University of Crete. 

From 2014 to 2016, he served as President of the Federation of European Toxicologists. He also founded a commercial spinoff company, ToxPlus SA.

Research

Tsatsakis's research is based on hormesis, interpreting “real-life human exposure” scenarios based on a long-term, low-dose exposure to chemical mixtures as well as “real-life risk simulation” studies.

He was previously editor-in-chief of Toxicology Reports, and an editor or guest editor for journals including Food and Chemical Toxicology, Toxicology, Toxicology Letters, and Experimental and Therapeutic Medicine.

He is a member of the Russian Academy of Sciences (RAS) and of the World Academy of Sciences. He has an honorary degree from the Carol Davila University of Medicine and Pharmacy in Romania.

Selected publications

Tsatsakis et al., 2016, New challenges in risk assessment of chemicals when simulating real exposure scenarios; simultaneous multi chemicals' low dose exposure, Food and Chemical Toxicology
Tsatsakis et al., 2017, Simulating real-life exposures to uncover possible risks to human health: A proposed consensus for a novel methodological approach. Human & Experimental Toxicology

References

External links 
 

Academic staff of the University of Crete
1957 births
Living people
Toxicologists